The National University of Technology – Córdoba Regional Faculty (Castilian: Universidad Tecnológica Nacional - Facultad Regional at Córdoba, Argentina, (UTN-FRC)).

Careers

Short Careers
Superior Technic on Industrial Maintenance.
Superior Technic on Food.
Superior Technic on Mechatronic.
Superior Technic on Programming.

Degrees
 Engineering:
Civil Engineering.
Electronics Engineering.
Electrical Engineering.
Industrial Engineering.
Mechanic Engineering.
 Metallurgical Engineering
Chemical Engineering.
Information Systems Engineering.

Postgraduate Degrees
 PhD degree:
 Engineering doctor.
 Mention in Chemical.
 Mention in Electronic.
 Mention in Materials.
 Master's degree:
 Master of Quality Engineering.
 Master of Business Administration.
 Master of Environmental Engineering.
 Master of University Teaching.
 Master of Automatic Control Engineering.
 Master of Information Systems Engineering.
 Specializations:
 Specialization in Quality Engineering.
 Specialization in Business Administration.
 Specialization in Environmental Engineering.
 Specialization in University Teaching.
 Specialization in Automatic Control Engineering.
 Specialization in Information Systems Engineering.
 Specialization in Work Hygiene and Safety.
 Other:
 Degree in Educational Technology.

Postgraduate Courses
Gas Chromatography.
Physics of Materials.
Projects Management

History 

This NTU College is one of the 24 regional faculties of the Universidad Tecnológica Nacional of Argentina.

Sources 

 Official website

Cordoba
Engineering universities and colleges in Argentina
Technical universities and colleges in Argentina